Mikhail Ivanovich Nozhkin (born January 19, 1937, Moscow) is a  Soviet and Russian film and theater actor, poet, musician. People's Artist of the RSFSR (1980).

References

External links
 

1937 births
Living people
Male actors from Moscow
Soviet male film actors
Russian male film actors
Soviet poets
Soviet male writers
20th-century Russian male writers
Russian male poets
Recipients of the Order of Honour (Russia)
People's Artists of the RSFSR
Recipients of the Vasilyev Brothers State Prize of the RSFSR
Russian-language poets
Russian songwriters
Russian male singer-songwriters
Russian male stage actors
Soviet male television actors
Honored Artists of the RSFSR